Troy Riddle is an American ice hockey coach and former center. He won two National Championships with Minnesota in 2002 and 2003.

Career
Riddle was a high-scoring prospect coming out of high school, averaging more than 3 points per game as a senior. As an 18-year old, he spent a year playing junior hockey with the Des Moines Buccaneers and finished second in team scoring. Afterwards, his performance was strong enough for the St. Louis Blues to select him in the 4th round of the 2000 NHL Entry Draft. The following fall, Riddle began attending the University of Minnesota and joined the ice hockey program. Straight away he contributed on offense and helped Minnesota make the NCAA tournament for the first time in four years. His production increased during his sophomore season while the team posted a 30-win season and won the national championship. During his junior season, Riddle came to the forefront of the Gopher's offense and his goal scoring saw a dramatic improvement. He finished second on the team in scoring and helped Minnesota capture its second consecutive championship. Riddle was named team captain for his senior season and continued to lead the Gophers on offense. He led Minnesota to its second-consecutive conference championship and fourth-consecutive NCAA tournament appearance while finishing second in team scoring once more.

After graduating with a degree in communications, Riddle signed with the Blues and joined their AHL affiliate the Worcester IceCats. He had a little difficulty catching up to the speed of the professional game and spent some time in the ECHL over the next two years. His stint with the Alaska Aces ended with the team winning its first Kelly Cup. After two years in the Blues' organization, Riddle was not retained and he spent the 2007 season with the Trenton Titans. After another year playing in the Minnesota Wild's pipeline, Riddle headed to Europe.

Riddle spent the 2009 season with the Graz 99ers producing moderate offensive numbers. After beginning the following year with EHC Basel, he returned to North America and finished out the year with the Tulsa Oilers. Riddle retired as a player after the season and became an assistant coach at his alma mater, Benilde-St. Margaret's. A year later, Riddle signed on with the Tohoku Free Blades and though he played well, finishing second in scoring, the team did not and missed the postseason. After the year, Riddle hung up his skated for good and returned to St. Margaret's.

Over the next decade, Riddle worked several jobs in the Minneapolis including as an assistant coach and skate instructor. In 2022, he was named as the head coach for the club team at Marquette.

Career statistics

Regular season and playoffs

International

Awards and honors

References

External links

1981 births
Living people
American ice hockey centers
Ice hockey people from Minnesota
Sportspeople from Minneapolis
Des Moines Buccaneers players
Minnesota Golden Gophers men's ice hockey players
NCAA men's ice hockey national champions
Worcester IceCats players
Peoria Rivermen (ECHL) players
Peoria Rivermen (AHL) players
Alaska Aces (ECHL) players
Trenton Titans players
Philadelphia Phantoms players
Houston Aeros (1994–2013) players
Texas Wildcatters players
Graz 99ers players
EHC Basel players
Tulsa Oilers (1992–present) players
Tohoku Free Blades players
Marquette Golden Eagles men's ice hockey coaches
St. Louis Blues draft picks